Shehab News Agency, is a Palestinian news agency. It was established in January 2007 in Gaza. Its website is blocked by the Palestinian Authority in the West Bank. Facebook blocked its accounts in 2021.

References

External links 

  

News agencies based in Palestine
Palestinian news websites